The 2018 Senior League World Series took place from July 28–August 4  in Easley, South Carolina. Willemstad, Curaçao defeated Wilmington, Delaware in the championship game.

Teams

Results

United States Bracket

International Bracket

Elimination Round

References

Senior League World Series
Senior League World Series
Senior
Senior League
Sports competitions in South Carolina